Tirelli Costumi Roma is a Rome-based costume house, which makes and supplies period costumes to motion picture productions. It has been sited, along with Costumi d'Arte and Peruzzi, as one of the best resources for 18th-century costumes.

History
The company was founded by Umberto Tirelli in 1964, following Tirelli's apprenticeship as a costume maker on The Leopard.

In addition to their film work, Tirelli Costumi has supplied and created costumes for stage productions. Their first was a production of Tosca at Teatro dell'Opera, a production directed by Mauro Bolognini with costumes by Anna Anni. Teatro del Maggio Musicale Fiorentino, Teatro Comunale di Bologna, Sferisterio di Macerata, La Fenice in Venice, La Scala in Milan, Teatro Regio in Parma, Teatro di San Carlo in Naples, Teatro Municipale Giuseppe Verdi in Salerno, Teatro Massimo Bellini in Catania, Teatro Petruzzelli in Bari, Teatro de la Maestranza in Seville, Teatro Massimo in Palermo, Teatro Comunale in Ferrara, Teatro delle Muse in Ancona, Teatro Flavio Vespasiano in Rieti, Teatro di Palma in Majorca, Teatro Pérez Galdós on Gran Canaria, Théâtre du Capitole in Toulouse, the Liceu in Barcelona, Teatro Colón in Buenos Aires, Teatro Municipal in Santiago, the New National Theatre in Tokyo, the Israeli Opera House in Tel Aviv and Royal Opera House in Muscat, Oman. Productions at the Festival Internacional de Santander, Maggio Musicale Fiorentino, the Ravenna Festival and Olbe A.B.A.O. Bilbao have utilized Tirelli garments.

As of 2019, Tirelli's fitting and administrative offices are located in the former residence of Marcello Mastroianni, while the company's warehouses are nearby, just outside Rome's city limits.

Selected filmography

Selected Television filmography

References

External links
 Tirelli Costumi on the IMDb
 Tirelli Costumi official site

Film production companies of Italy
Clothing companies of Italy
Manufacturing companies based in Rome